Heydon is a surname. Notable people with the surname include:

Benjamin Heydon, Anglican clergyman
Charles Heydon (1845–1932), Australian politician and judge
Christopher Heydon (1561–1623), English soldier, politician and astrologist
Dyson Heydon (born 1943), Australian judge
Henry Heydon (died 1504)
John Heydon (died 1479)
John Heydon (astrologer) (1629 – c. 1667), English philosopher, astrologer and writer
John Heydon (footballer) (born 1928), English footballer
Sir John Heydon (died 1653), English Royalist military commander and mathematician
Louis Heydon (1848–1919), Australian politician
Martin Heydon (born 1978), Irish politician
Mike Heydon (1874–1913), American baseball player
Nigel Heydon (born 1970), English darts player
Rob Heydon (born 1970), Canadian film director